The Basel Summer Ice Hockey is an ice hockey tournament held in Basel, Switzerland every August before the start of many domestic European ice hockey seasons. All matches are played at the home of the EHC Basel ice hockey club, that being St. Jakob Arena.

This tournament has been contested since 2009.

Tournaments

External links

 
International ice hockey competitions hosted by Switzerland
Sport in Basel